The 1914 United States Senate election in New York was held on November 3. Incumbent Republican Senator Elihu Root chose not to seek re-election. James Wolcott Wadsworth Jr. was elected to a succeed Root, defeating Democrat James Watson Gerard.

Primary elections were held on September 28. These were the first direct primaries (in which party members chose each candidate individually rather than as part of a slate) in the history of New York state. James Wolcott Wadsworth Jr. narrowly defeated William M. Calder for the Republican nomination. James Watson Gerard won the Democratic nomination in a landslide over Franklin Delano Roosevelt, a rare setback in the political career of the future President of the United States.

This election for Senate was the first decided by popular vote in New York, as required following the passage of the Seventeenth Amendment.

Republican primary

Candidates
 William M. Calder, U.S. Representative from Brooklyn
 David Jayne Hill, former U.S. Assistant Secretary of State and Ambassador to Switzerland, Luxembourg, the Netherlands, and Germany
 James Wolcott Wadsworth Jr., State Assemblyman from Livingston County and former Speaker of the Assembly

Withdrew
Harvey D. Hinman, former State Senator from Binghamton (ran for Governor)

Declined
 Elihu Root, incumbent Senator since 1909

Campaign
The Republican primary was a skirmish in the feud between the conservative party establishment led by William Barnes Jr. and the progressive followers of Theodore Roosevelt, brought to new heights by Roosevelt's July editorial denouncing Barnes as corrupt.

Calder announced his campaign on June 16 with the full backing of the Kings County Republican Committee and the understanding that Senator Root would not accept re-nomination. Another progressive, Harvey D. Hinman, entered the race with the apparent support of Theodore Roosevelt and more established progressives, who urged Calder to clear the field for him. After Root's refusal was publicly substantiated, James W. Wadsworth became a likely candidate for the conservative party establishment, given that he had become Speaker of the Assembly with then-President Roosevelt's support years prior.

Following Wadsworth's entry into the race, Hinman withdrew and Calder successfully convinced him to run for Governor.

Roosevelt's feud with Barnes played a major role in the race. Progressive candidates attacked Wadsworth and gubernatorial candidate Charles S. Whitman for their association with Barnes. By election day, the Barnes faction was expected to succeed through its strength outside of New York City.

Results

Aftermath
Following Wadsworth's victory, some progressive Republicans bolted the party for the Progressive organization.

Calder would be elected to the Senate himself in 1916, serving alongside Wadsworth for one term.

Democratic primary

Candidates
 James Watson Gerard, United States Ambassador to Germany
 James S. McDonough
 Franklin Delano Roosevelt, Assistant Secretary of the Navy and former State Senator from Hyde Park

Declined
William Randolph Hearst, multi-millionaire newspaper publisher and perennial candidate

Campaign

Assistant Secretary of the Navy Franklin Delano Roosevelt was an early candidate for the Senate, privately expressing his interest in both the Democratic and Progressive nominations following Root's retirement. Roosevelt had previously hoped to run for Governor against Tammany Hall incumbent Martin H. Glynn but demurred after he failed to win the support of President Woodrow Wilson. His entry into the campaign was delayed in June by the assassination of Franz Ferdinand and early movements towards World War I.

Roosevelt finally announced his candidacy on August 13 at the urging of Treasury Secretary William Gibbs McAdoo. Roosevelt, who had been the leader of the reform faction in the State Senate years prior, spent all of August confident that he would be the Democratic nominee and did not bother to appear at his campaign's kickoff rally on September 2.

In late August, Roosevelt won the endorsement of Governor Glynn, a coup in his efforts to reconcile the reformers with Tammany. However, Tammany surprised Roosevelt and the national party by putting forward U.S. Ambassador to Germany James Watson Gerard as a candidate on September 6, the penultimate day to file for the ballot.

Roosevelt was caught unprepared by Gerard's candidacy, which had the White House's blessing. Gerard was also independently wealthy and had a reputation for honesty that gave him distance from Tammany corruption. Most importantly, Gerard was able to avoid a personal undertaking by attending to his duties in Berlin, leaving Roosevelt no room to criticize him.

Roosevelt attempted a last-minute campaign tour but made little impression on voters. One upstate paper reported, "When compared to such a man as Elihu Root he cuts a sorry figure as a great statesman."

Results

Progressive primary

Candidates
 Bainbridge Colby, former State Assemblyman and founder of the Progressive Party

Results

General election

Candidates
 Erwin A. Aucher (Socialist Labor)
 Francis E. Baldwin, perennial candidate (Prohibition)
 Bainbridge Colby, former State Assemblyman (Progressive)
 James Watson Gerard, United States Ambassador to Germany (Democratic)
 Charles Edward Russell, investigative journalist and co-founder of the NAACP (Socialist)
 James Wolcott Wadsworth Jr., State Assemblyman and former Speaker of the Assembly (Republican)

Results

References

Bibliography

1914
New York
1914 New York (state) elections